Dard Divorce is a German independent horror film directed by Olaf Ittenbach and stars Christopher Kiesa, Daryl Jackson and Martina Ittenbach.

Plot 
Nathalie Stein, an embittered and exhausted young woman, is currently going through a bitter divorce from her husband Tim. A qualified attorney, she is doing her best to ensure that her two children, Jeremy and Elisabeth, never see their father again. Tim arrives to pick the children up for what is believed to be one last time. He fails to return with the children.

Nathalie's dog disappears under mysterious circumstances and she then discovers a piece of paper with the word "Dard" (the Persian word for "to inflict pain") written in blood in her house. Panicked, she calls the police, who cannot help without more evidence of a crime. She decides to meet Tim and the children in Chinatown, but they do not show up.

In the evening, Tim suddenly appears at the house, apparently badly injured. Before dying, he tells Nathalie that the children have been abducted. She immediately informs the police, but when the detective, James Gates, arrives, the body is gone and the site has been cleaned up leaving no evidence that Nathalie is telling the truth. Later a police officer, Phil Warren arrives to question Nathalie. Warren is revealed to be corrupt and overpowers Nathalie. Graphically depicted in flashback, he tells Nathalie that Tim had been hired by the Persian Mafioso Maho and had burst in on a drug deal organised by Maho, killing those present before running off with a million dollars in cash and the cocaine. Convinced that the drugs are hidden in the house, he tells her he has killed her son Jeremy with a chainsaw and will kill Elisabeth as well if he is not told where drugs and money are, Warren then tortures Nathalie in an attempt to get the information out of her, cutting off a finger and a toe with pruning shears. Nathalie eventually manages to break free and kills Warren with a broken bottle.

Then a mysterious man by the name of Daniel appears who informs her he had been following Warren. He offers to help her, tends to her wounds and calms her down. His story is somewhat different (also depicted in flashback) – that Tim had chanced upon a drug deal that had gone bad and that he had got hold of the two cases entirely innocently before disappearing. However, it is then revealed that Daniel's intentions are less honourable than they appeared – he drugs Nathalie and disposes of Warren's body. Daniel explains how he tortured and killed Nathalie's loved ones before torturing Nathalie herself with a hammer. Although under the effects of a local anaesthesia, she head-butts Daniel and is able to plunge a hypodermic into his eye before killing him with a knife.

Severely wounded, she clambers up the stairs when the phone begins to a ring. It is Detective Gates who is also corrupt. Gates sends her daughter Elisabeth in and points a sniper rifle at her head, ordering Nathalie to reveal the location of the money and drugs and to not move or he will shoot her daughter. Remembering their dogs disappearance, Nathalie suspects it has something to do with where the money is buried so Nathalie and Elisabeth attempt to come up with the answer through a riddle posed in one of Tim's old children's songs which reveals the location to them. As Nathalie bends to pick up a pencil however, Gates shoots Elisabeth in the shoulder. Nathalie picks up Daniel's pistol and shoots Gates as he enters the house.

Nathalie runs alone to the cornfield and meets Tim there, who has their son. The true story is revealed – Gates had employed Tim as an informer and was supposed to give him Moha. As Gates was one of the most corrupt cops in the precinct, Tim was ordered to kill Maha and bring him the drugs and money. Tim slipped some E 605 into the coffee at the diner killing the mafiosi and then shoots the other party when they arrive to make the deal. Nathalie was his last obstacle but, as Tim is about to shoot her, he is shot by his daughter Elisabeth from behind. Nathalie and the children begin a new life.

Cast
 Martina Ittenbach as Nathalie Stein
 Daryl Jackson as Daniel
 Jaymes Butler as Police officer Phil Warren
 Barrett Jones as Tim
 Kamary Phillips as Detective James Gates
 Gideon Jackson as Jeremy
 Henora Jackson as Elisabeth
 Kami Esfahani as Moha
 Christopher Kriesa as Lawyer Jake
 Torsten Mühlbach as Lover
 Olaf Ittenbach as Guy on Street
 Martin Faltermeier as Mafia Gangster
 Stefan Altenberg as Mafia Gangster
 Thomas Waldner as Mafia Gangster
 Cooper Ritchie as Cook
 Siegmund Dallmayer as Cook
 Tobias Muth as Cook
 Peter Uebel as Cook
 Claudia Schwind as Cop in House
 Peter Dubiel as Cop #1
 Rainer Metz as Cop #2
 Peter Eherer as Creature
 Gregor Olbrys as Creature
 Thomas Reitmair as Barkeeper
 Jackie as Dog / Bonny

Production 
Due to the limited budget, Olaf Ittenbach used his own house as the filming location and only filmed at weekends. Other shots were taken at a local restaurant and a farm. Principal photography commenced on 28 September 2006 and lasted until 7 July 2007. Ittenbach travelled to the United States with his wife Martina to take a number of shots throughout the country in San Francisco, Los Angeles, Price Canyon and the Nevada Desert. Another brief exterior shot was filmed at Ridgecrest. Although the film was a German production, the film was made in English and later dubbed into German to achieve a wider market.

Release
The film's première was on 1 November 2009 in Première at San Sebastián International Film Festivalin Spain and was released on 11 April 2009 of DVD in Germany. Due to the obscurity of the word Dard in the title the English version was retitled Dark Divorce.

References

External links 
 
 Official Website

2007 films
2007 horror films
2000s thriller drama films
2007 independent films
2007 psychological thriller films
English-language German films
German independent films
German horror films
German psychological thriller films
German thriller drama films
German splatter films
German psychological drama films
German horror drama films
Films directed by Olaf Ittenbach
2007 drama films
2000s English-language films
2000s German films